The 1909 All-Ireland Senior Hurling Championship Final was the 22nd All-Ireland Final and the culmination of the 1909 All-Ireland Senior Hurling Championship, an inter-county hurling tournament for the top teams in Ireland. The match was held at the Cork Athletic Grounds, Cork, on 12 December 1909 between Kilkenny, represented by a club side from Mooncoin, and Tipperary, represented by club side Thurles. The Munster champions lost to their Leinster opponents on a score line of 4-6 to 0-12.

This was Tipperary's first defeat in an All-Ireland final.

Match details

1
All-Ireland Senior Hurling Championship Finals
Kilkenny GAA matches
Tipperary GAA matches
December 1909 sports events